Jules Armand Stanislas Dufaure (4 December 1798 – 28 June 1881) was a French statesman.

Biography
Dufaure was born at Saujon, Charente-Maritime, and began his career as an advocate at Bordeaux, where he won a great reputation by his oratorical gifts. He abandoned law for politics and, in 1834, was elected deputy. In 1839, he became minister of public works in the ministry of Jean-de-Dieu Soult, and succeeded in freeing railway construction in France from the obstacles which until then had hampered it.

Losing office in 1840, Dufaure became one of the leaders of the Opposition, and on the outbreak of the revolution of 1848, he accepted the Republic and joined the party of moderate republicans. On 13 October, he became minister of the interior under Louis-Eugène Cavaignac, but retired on the latter's defeat in the presidential election. During the Second French Empire, Dufaure abstained from public life, and practised at the Paris bar with such success that he was elected bâtonnier in 1862.

In 1863, he succeeded to Étienne-Denis Pasquier's seat in the Académie Française. In 1871, he became a member of the Assembly, and proposed Adolphe Thiers as President of the Republic. Dufaure became the minister of justice as chief of the party of the "left-centre," and his tenure of office was distinguished by the passage of the jury-law. In 1873, he fell with Thiers, but in 1875 resumed his former post under Louis Buffet, whom he succeeded on 9 March 1876, the first to become president of the council (his predecessors wore the title of vice-presidents of the council). In the same year, he was elected a life senator. On 12 December, he withdrew from the ministry owing to the attacks of the republicans of the left in the chamber and of the conservatives in the senate.

After the conservatives' defeat on 16 May, he returned to power on 24 December 1877. Early in 1879, Dufaure took part in compelling the resignation of Patrice MacMahon, duc de Magenta, but immediately afterwards (1 February), worn out by opposition, he retired. As Prime Minister, he served as the Acting President of the Republic on 30 January 1879.

See G Picot, M. Dufaure, sa vie et ses discours (Paris, 1883).

Dufaure's First Government, 19 February 1871 – 18 May 1873
 Jules Dufaure – President of the Council and Minister of Justice
 Jules Favre – Minister of Foreign Affairs
 Adolphe Charles Le Flô – Minister of War
 Ernest Picard – Minister of the Interior
 Louis Buffet – Minister of Finance
 Louis Marie Alexis Pothuau – Minister of Marine and Colonies
 Jules Simon – Minister of Public Instruction, Fine Arts, and Worship
 Charles de Larcy – Minister of Public Works
 Félix Lambrecht – Minister of Agriculture and Commerce

Changes
 25 February 1871 – Augustin Pouyer-Quertier succeeds Buffet as Minister of Finance.
 5 June 1871 – Ernest Courtot de Cissey succeeds Le Flô as Minister of War. Félix Lambrecht succeeds Picard as Minister of the Interior. Victor Lefranc succeeds Lambrecht as Minister of Agriculture and Commerce.
 2 August 1871 – The Comte de Rémusat, succeeds Favre as Minister of Foreign Affairs
 11 October 1871 – Auguste Casimir-Perier succeeds Lambrecht as Minister of the Interior
 6 February 1872 – Victor Lefranc succeeds Casimir-Perier as Minister of the Interior. Eugène de Goulard succeeds Lefranc as Minister of Agriculture and Commerce.
 23 April 1872 – Eugène de Goulard succeeds Pouyer-Quertier as Minister of Finance. Pierre Teisserenc de Bort succeeds Goulard as Minister of Agriculture and Commerce.
 7 December 1872 – Eugène de Goulard succeeds Lefranc as Minister of the Interior. Léon Say succeeds Goulard as Minister of Finance. Oscar Bardi de Fourtou succeeds Larcy as Minister of Public Works.

Dufaure's Second Government, 18–25 May 1873
 Jules Dufaure – President of the Council and Minister of Justice
 Comte de Rémusat – Minister of Foreign Affairs
 Ernest Courtot de Cissey – Minister of War
 Auguste Casimir-Perier – Minister of the Interior
 Léon Say – Minister of Finance
 Louis Marie Alexis Pothuau – Minister of Marine and Colonies
 William Henry Waddington – Minister of Public Instruction
 Oscar Bardi de Fourtou – Minister of Worship
 René Bérenger – Minister of Public Works
 Pierre Teisserenc de Bort – Minister of Agriculture and Commerce

Dufaure's Third Government, 23 February – 9 March 1876
 Jules Dufaure – President of the Council and Minister of the Interior and of Justice
 Louis Decazes – Minister of Foreign Affairs
 Ernest Courtot de Cissey – Minister of War
 Eugène Caillaux – Minister of Finance and Public Works
 Louis Raymond de Montaignac de Chauvannce – Minister of Marine and Colonies
 Henri Wallon – Minister of Public Instruction, Fine Arts, and Worship
 Vicomte de Meaux – Minister of Agriculture and Commerce

Dufaure's Fourth Government, 9 March – 12 December 1876
 Jules Dufaure – President of the Council and Minister of Justice
 Louis Decazes – Minister of Foreign Affairs
 Ernest Courtot de Cissey – Minister of War
 Amable Ricard – Minister of the Interior
 Léon Say – Minister of Finance
 Martin Fourichon – Minister of Marine
 William Henry Waddington – Minister of Public Instruction
 Albert Christophle – Minister of Public Works
 Pierre Teisserenc de Bort – Minister of Agriculture and Commerce

Changes
 11 May 1876 – Émile de Marcère succeeds Ricard as Minister of the Interior.
 15 August 1876 – Jean Auguste Berthaud succeeds Courtot de Cissey as Minister of War.

Dufaure's Fifth Government, 13 December 1877 – 4 February 1879
 Jules Dufaure – President of the Council and Minister of Justice
 William Henry Waddington – Minister of Foreign Affairs
 Jean-Louis Borel – Minister of War
 Émile de Marcère – Minister of the Interior
 Léon Say – Minister of Finance
 Louis Marie Alexis Pothuau – Minister of Marine and Colonies
 Agénor Bardoux – Minister of Public Instruction, Fine Arts, and Worship
 Charles de Freycinet – Minister of Public Works
 Pierre Teisserenc de Bort – Minister of Agriculture and Commerce

Changes
 16 May 1878 – Henri François Xavier Gresley succeeds Borel as Minister of War.

References
 

1798 births
1881 deaths
19th-century heads of state of France
People from Charente-Maritime
Politicians from Nouvelle-Aquitaine
Orléanists
French republicans
Prime Ministers of France
French interior ministers
Government ministers of France
Members of the 3rd Chamber of Deputies of the July Monarchy
Members of the 4th Chamber of Deputies of the July Monarchy
Members of the 5th Chamber of Deputies of the July Monarchy
Members of the 6th Chamber of Deputies of the July Monarchy
Members of the 7th Chamber of Deputies of the July Monarchy
Members of the 1848 Constituent Assembly
Members of the National Legislative Assembly of the French Second Republic
Members of the National Assembly (1871)
Members of the 1st Chamber of Deputies of the French Third Republic
French life senators
Members of the Académie Française